The 2015 James Madison Dukes football team represented James Madison University during the 2015 NCAA Division I FCS football season. They were led by second-year head coach Everett Withers and played their home games at Bridgeforth Stadium and Zane Showker Field. They were a member of the Colonial Athletic Association (CAA). The Dukes finished the regular season 9–2 to share the CAA championship with William & Mary and Richmond, who all finished with identical 6–2 conference records. They received an at-large bid to the FCS Playoffs, where they lost in the second round to Colgate and finish the season 9–3.

On January 6, 2016, Withers resigned to become the head coach at Texas State. He finished at James Madison with a two year record of 18–7.

Previous season
In 2014, the Dukes finished with a record of 9–4, 6–2 in CAA play, to finish in third place. They received an at-large bid to the FCS Playoffs and hosted Liberty in the first round. The Dukes lost to the Flames, 21–26, and were eliminated from the playoffs.

Schedule

Game summaries

Morehead State

Lehigh

Albany

SMU

Stony Brook

Towson

Elon

Richmond

ESPN's College GameDay broadcast from the JMU campus for the first time.

William & Mary

Delaware

Villanova

FCS Playoffs

Second Round–Colgate

Ranking movements

References

James Madison
James Madison Dukes football seasons
Colonial Athletic Association football champion seasons
James Madison
James Madison Dukes football